Illinois Route 61 (IL 61) is a rural state road in western Illinois that runs north and east from Illinois Route 96 in Ursa to the intersection of U.S. Route 136  west of Tennessee.

Route description

Illinois 61 starts in Ursa at the intersection of County Route 6, Illinois Route 96 (IL 96), and itself. After a short concurrency with IL 96, it travels northeast through farmland, passing Mendon. Shortly afterwards, it runs concurrently with the partially grade-separated Illinois Route 336 (IL 336) northwards. It splits off and east just south of Loraine, and travels north concurrent with Illinois Route 94 (IL 94), splitting off to the east afterwards in Bowen. It intersects Illinois Route 101 (IL 101) and heads north once again. Its northern terminus is at U.S. 136.

History
SBI Route 61 was originally established in 1924 was the route between Richmond and Crystal Lake in northeastern Illinois. This route is now part of Illinois Route 31.

This route was established after 1937, when SBI Route 61 was removed from the Richmond to Crystal Lake route in northeastern Illinois.  Since the route was established, it has served as the major route between Quincy, IL and Macomb, IL, bypassing Carthage, Illinois.  The route crosses the LaMoine River south of Colmar and parallels the Quincy branch of the old Chicago, Burlington & Quincy railroad along sections of its route.

The route is currently designated as a Class II Truck Route.

Major intersections

See also
Illinois Route 336

References

External links

 Illinois State Route 61, Adams County
 Illinois State Route 336, Adams County
 Illinois Highway Ends: Illinois Route 61

061
Transportation in Adams County, Illinois
Transportation in Hancock County, Illinois
Transportation in McDonough County, Illinois